The 2022 Internazionali Femminili di Tennis Città di Caserta was a professional tennis tournament played on outdoor clay courts. It was the thirty-third edition of the tournament which was part of the 2022 ITF Women's World Tennis Tour. It took place in Caserta, Italy between 6 and 12 June 2022.

Champions

Singles

  Kristina Mladenovic def.  Camilla Rosatello, 6–4, 4–6, 7–6(7–3)

Doubles

  Despina Papamichail /  Camilla Rosatello def.  Francisca Jorge /  Matilde Jorge, 4–6, 6–2, [10–6]

Singles main draw entrants

Seeds

 1 Rankings are as of 23 May 2022.

Other entrants
The following players received wildcards into the singles main draw:
  Antonia Aragosa
  Nuria Brancaccio
  Melania Delai
  Lisa Pigato

The following players received entry from the qualifying draw:
  Federica Bilardo
  Diletta Cherubini
  Oana Gavrilă
  Zhibek Kulambayeva
  Irene Lavino
  Elena Malõgina
  Matilda Mutavdzic
  Angelica Raggi

References

External links
 2022 Internazionali Femminili di Tennis Città di Caserta at ITFtennis.com
 Official website

2022 ITF Women's World Tennis Tour
2022 in Italian tennis
June 2022 sports events in Italy